Henriette Michèle Akaba Edoa (born 7 June 1992), shortly Henriette Akaba, or Michèle Akaba, is a Cameroonian professional footballer, who plays as a forward for the Turkish Super League club ALG Spor and the Cameroon women's national team.

She has played in the Turkish Women's First Football League for Beşiktaş J.K. with jersey number 18 and in the Division 1 Féminine for ASJ Soyaux.

Club career 

Akaba began her football career with Amazone FC in her hometown in Cameroon. In Spring 2008, she went to the rival Lorient FC Yaoundé, where she debuted as a senior player in the Ligue 2. After two and half years, she moved to Thailand in Spring 2010 to play for Bangkokthonburi SC in the Thailandish Women's First League. After one year, she returned home, and signed with Canon Yaoundé. In November 2011, Akaba joined Louves Minproff de Yaoundé. In Spring 2012, she moved to Russia to play for FC Energy Voronezh in the 2011–12 UEFA Women's Champions League. After only a half year, she returned to her country in June 2012, and joined Lorema FC Filles De Yaoundé.

End 2015, Akaba moved to Turkey, and was transferred on 4 December by  Trabzon İdmanocağı, which competes in the Women's First League. She scored already one goal for her new team in the home match against Kireçburnu Spor two days later.

In October 2017, Akaba signed a two-year contract with the Istanbul-based club Ataşehir Belediyespor effective 2 January 2018. She participation at the 2018–19 UEFA Women's Champions League qualifying round. She scored one goal each in all three matches she played. In the 2018–19 league season, she transferred to Beşiktaş J.K.

In February 2023, she moved again to Turkey, and signed with the Gaziantep-based club ALG Spor to play in the second half of the 2022–23 Super League season.

International career 
Akaba is a member of the Cameroon women's national football team, nicknamed the "Indomitable Lionesses". She took part in women's football tournament at the 2012 Summer Olympics, in 2015 FIFA Women's World Cup Group C and in 2019 FIFA Women's World Cup Group E. She capped 66 times for the national team.

Career statistics 
.

Honours 
 Turkish Women's First Football League
 Trabzon İdmanocağı (women)
 Third places (1): 2015–16

 Ataşehir Belediyespor
 Winners (1): 2017–18

References

External links 
 

1992 births
Living people
Footballers from Yaoundé
Cameroonian women's footballers
20th-century Cameroonian women
21st-century Cameroonian women
Women's association football forwards
Canon Yaoundé players
FC Energy Voronezh players
FC Minsk (women) players
ASJ Soyaux-Charente players
Santa Teresa CD players
FC Levante Las Planas players
Division 1 Féminine players
Segunda Federación (women) players
Cameroon women's international footballers
2015 FIFA Women's World Cup players
Competitors at the 2015 African Games
African Games medalists in football
African Games silver medalists for Cameroon
2019 FIFA Women's World Cup players
Cameroonian expatriate women's footballers
Cameroonian expatriate sportspeople in Thailand
Expatriate footballers in Thailand
Cameroonian expatriate sportspeople in Russia
Expatriate women's footballers in Russia
Cameroonian expatriate sportspeople in Turkey
Expatriate women's footballers in Turkey
Trabzon İdmanocağı women's players
Ataşehir Belediyespor players
Beşiktaş J.K. women's football players
Cameroonian expatriate sportspeople in France
Expatriate women's footballers in France
Cameroonian expatriate sportspeople in Spain
Expatriate women's footballers in Spain
Turkish Women's Football Super League players
ALG Spor players